Coastal Lamptrai, or Lamptrai Paraliai or Lamptra Paralios (Λάμπτρα παράλιος), also known as Lamptrai Hypenerthen (Λαμπτραὶ ὑπένερθεν) or Lamptra Hypenerthen (Λάμπτρα ὑπένερθεν), both meaning Lower Lamptra[i], was a deme of ancient Attica. Lamptrai Paraloi and nearby Upper Lamptrai (Lamptrai Kathyperthen) were between Anagyrus, Thorae, and Aegilia. At Lamptra the grave of Cranaus was shown.

The site of Coastal Lamptrai was near modern Kitsi.

References

Populated places in ancient Attica
Former populated places in Greece
Demoi